Clarence Alfred Cole (June 15, 1909 – April 11, 1963) was the third bishop of the Episcopal Diocese of Upper South Carolina, serving from 1953 to 1963.

Early life and education
Cole was born in Washington, D.C. on June 15, 1909, the son of Carl Adams Cole and Blanche Margaret Mack. He was educated at public school of Washington, D.C., before studying at Benjamin Franklin University from where he earned a Bachelor of Science in 1930. He also attended Duke University and graduated with a Bachelor of Arts in 1933. He graduated with a Bachelor of Divinity in 1936 from the University of the South, and was awarded a Doctor of Divinity from the same university in 1954.

Ordained Ministry
Cole was ordained deacon in June 1936 by Bishop James E. Freeman of Washington and priest in May 1937 by Bishop Albert Sidney Thomas of South Carolina.  He married Catherine Tate Powe on June 1, 1938, and together had six children. He served as assistant rector of Grace Church in Charleston, South Carolina from 1936 till 1938, and then as rector of St Stephen's Church in Oxford, North Carolina. In 1941 he became rector of St Martin's Church in Charlotte, North Carolina, before becoming rector of St John's Church in Charleston, West Virginia on March 3, 1952.

Episcopacy
In May 1953, Cole was elected on the fifth ballot as Bishop of Upper South Carolina, during the 31st convention of the diocese. He was consecrated on October 20, 1953, in Trinity Cathedral in Columbia, South Carolina. He died in office in Providence Hospital, Columbia, South Carolina after suffering several heart attacks.

References

External links 
Grave

1885 births
1963 deaths
Christians from Washington, D.C.
Sewanee: The University of the South alumni
Duke University alumni
Benjamin Franklin University alumni
Episcopal bishops of Upper South Carolina